Goldstar is an Israeli brand of 4.9% abv lager brewed by Tempo in Netanya, Israel.  It is marketed as a dark lager beer, though it is amber in appearance.

History
According to Tempo Beer Industries, Goldstar was developed by brewmaster Menachem Berliner in 1950 and was the first Israeli draft beer. It was among the products acquired by Tempo in 1985.

Markets
Goldstar is considered Tempo's "flagship brand". Certified kosher, it is currently the top-selling beer in Israel.

Advertising and sponsorship
A number of celebrity images have been used to advertise the beer, ranging from Paul Newman to Claudia Schiffer. In 2015, Tempo has faced media criticism for a "sexist" ad.

Goldstar is the title sponsor of the Goldstar Zappa Sound System music festival.

Reception
The Forward called Goldstar and several other beers commonly consumed in Israel "light, easy-drinking beers — the stuff zayde might drink on a hot day". However, Haaretz has referred to Goldstar as "beer few Israelis are proud of".

References

Beer in Israel
Drink companies of Israel
Israeli brands